The France national football team represents the nation of France in international association football. It is fielded by the French Football Federation (FFF) and competes as a member of the Union of European Football Associations (UEFA). The team played its first official international match on 1 May 1904 against Belgium. Since its first competitive match, more than 800 players have made at least one international appearance for the team. Of them, 105 have served as captain of the national team. This list contains football (soccer) players who have served as captain of the France national team and is listed according to their number of matches captained.

The France national team's record appearance-maker as captain is Didier Deschamps, who led the team out 52 times during his 103-cap tenure, which lasted through three decades. Deschamps is also the most successful France captain, having worn the armband, an indicator of the team's captain, in team victories at the 1998 FIFA World Cup and UEFA Euro 2000. The Bayonne-born midfielder surpassed the previous record-holder of the France captaincy, midfielder Michel Platini, in the team's semi-final match at the latter competition. Platini became the first France captain to win a major international competition after leading the team in the 1984 European Football Championship. Aside from Deschamps and Platini, only three other players have captained France on over 40 occasions: defenders Roger Marche and Marcel Desailly, and goalkeeper Hugo Lloris. Marche is one of two French captains to lead the team at two FIFA World Cup competitions. Desailly captained the team to victories at the 2001 and 2003 editions of the FIFA Confederations Cup. He is one of four players to be sent off in a FIFA World Cup final, one of the other three being fellow France captain Zinedine Zidane. Lloris captained France to victory at the 2018 FIFA World Cup and to the final of UEFA Euro 2016 and the 2022 FIFA World Cup.

History 

The first captain of the France national team was Fernand Canelle, who captained the national team in its first international match against Belgium on 1 May 1904. Canelle went on to captain France only once more in a 7–0 defeat to Belgium in 1905. The team's next captain was Pierre Allemane, who had previously captained a team representing France at the 1900 Summer Olympics. However, this occurred when the team was under the supervision of the Union des Sociétés Françaises de Sports Athlétiques (USFSA), a federation sports union that supported amateur sport. Under the Fédération Internationale de Football Association (FIFA) governing body, Allemane is the only French player to wear the armband in all of his national team appearances. Aside from Canelle and Allemane, Gaston Barreau, René Bonnet, Étienne Jourde, and Robert Lemaître are the only other players to ever captain the national team on their debuts. Bonnet's captaincy is notable due in part to the fact that it was his only appearance with the national team. The first player to captain France in a major international competition while playing under FIFA was André François. He led the team at the football tournament in the 1908 Summer Olympics and captained France to the worst loss in national team and competition history, a 17–1 loss to Denmark. One of the first permanent captains of the national team was Jean Ducret. He captained the team 13 times between 1910–1914.

Alexandre Villaplane captained France in its first FIFA World Cup match in 1930 and went on to captain the team in the entire tournament. Maurice Cottenet was the first goalkeeper to captain the national team. Alex Thépot was the second and bore the armband at the 1934 FIFA World Cup. The team's first captain after World War II was Alfred Aston. Aston captained the team for the first time in its first match following the conclusion of the war, a 3–1 win over Belgium on Christmas Eve 1944, and subsequently led the team out six more times. Following Aston, the captaincy was rotated among striker Jean Baratte and defenders Roger Marche and Robert Jonquet. Marche and Jonquet alternated the armband at the 1954 and 1958 editions of the FIFA World Cup. Following the retirement of Baratte, Marche took primary control of the captaincy and guided the team until his international retirement in 1960. The former Stade de Reims defender held the record of captaining France the most until he was surpassed by Michel Platini in 1986. Platini is the first France captain to lead the team to victory in a major international competition. He accomplished this feat at UEFA Euro 1984. In 2000, Platini was surpassed by Didier Deschamps, who captained France to its first FIFA World Cup title in 1998. Deschamps surpassed Platini during UEFA Euro 2000 in the team's semi-final match against Portugal. France won the match, 2–1. In the final, France defeated Italy, giving Deschamps his second major honour as captain. Deschamps was succeeded by Marcel Desailly, who ranks second in captaining France the most. Desailly captained France to victory at both the 2001 and 2003 editions of the FIFA Confederations Cup.

From 2004 to 2010, when Raymond Domenech managed the national team, the captaincy regularly alternated between Patrick Vieira and Zinedine Zidane. The former player was given the captaincy first, but handed it over to Zidane when he returned to the team in 2005. Zidane subsequently wore the armband at the 2006 FIFA World Cup and became the first French captain and just the fourth player in association football history to be sent off in a World Cup final match. Former teammate and captain Marcel Desailly is one of the other three. Following Zidane's retirement, Vieira was designated captain of the team for its UEFA Euro 2008 campaign, however, injuries hampered his stint as captain and, as a result, defender Lilian Thuram led the team at the competition. The last permanent captain of the team was the national team's all-time leading goalscorer, Thierry Henry. He first captained the team on 6 February 2008 in a friendly against Spain when he was given the armband following the substitution of Vieira. He held onto the captaincy until a month before the 2010 FIFA World Cup following his relegation to a substitute's role. The armband was given to defender Patrice Evra who led the team at the competition. Under manager Laurent Blanc, several players made their debuts as captains of the national team. In August 2010, Philippe Mexès captained the team for the first time. The following month, Florent Malouda made his debut as captain. In November, Hugo Lloris became the ninth goalkeeper in national team history to wear the armband and, in March, midfielder Samir Nasri captained the team for the first time.

Captains 

Appearances and matches captained are composed of FIFA World Cup, UEFA European Football Championship, FIFA Confederations Cup, and pre-World Cup Summer Olympics matches and each competition's required qualification matches, as well as numerous international friendly tournaments and matches. Players are initially listed by number of matches captained, followed by number of international caps attained. If the number of matches captained and the number of caps earned are equal, then the player who captained the national team first is listed first. Statistics correct as of 18 December 2022.

Timeline

See also 
 List of France international footballers
 List of leading goalscorers for the France national football team

Notes

References

External links 
  Official site 

captains
France
Association football player non-biographical articles